The Little Iskut River is a tributary of the Iskut River in the northwest part of the province of British Columbia, Canada, in Cassiar Land District. The Little Iskut River is part of the Stikine River drainage basin, as the Iskut River is a major tributary of the Stikine.

The river's watershed's land cover is classified as 36.8% conifer forest, 27.9% barren, 17.3% shrubland, 10.3% herbaceous, and small amounts of other cover.

The Little Iskut River is in the asserted traditional territory of the Tahltan First Nation and Iskut First Nation, of the Tahltan people.

Geography
The Little Iskut River originates at Little Ball Lake just south of Kounugu Mountain. It flows northeast through the southern part of Mount Edziza Provincial Park, then north, forming the southeastern boundary of the park. It collects tributary streams flowing east from the Spectrum Range. Stewbomb Creek and its tributary Artifact Creek flow from Obsidian Ridge, Artifact Ridge, and high mountains including Yeda Peak and Kitsu Peak. Bourgeaux Creek and its tributary Gerlib Creek also flow east from the Spectrum Range, Artifact Ridge, and high peaks including Tadeda Peak and Armadillo Peak.

Between Stewbomb Creek and Bourgeaux Creek the historic Yukon Telegraph Trail crosses the Little Iskut River, following Bourgeaux Creek over Raspberry Pass to Mess Creek, continuing north to Telegraph Creek on the Stikine River. After Bourgeaux Creek, near Mowdade Lake, the Little Iskut turns sharply to flow southeast. It empties into the Iskut River just downstream of Cascade Falls.

The Little Iskut River is a major tributary of the Iskut River. About 5% of its watershed is glacier-covered. Much of the lower Little Iskut River is braided.

Geology
During the Miocene epoch, a series of lava flows from the adjacent Mount Edziza volcanic complex travelled east into the Little Iskut River. Here, the flows formed a lava dam behind which water ponded to form Raspberry Lake. Water discharging from this prehistoric lake eventually cut through the eastern edge of this dam to create a new course for the Little Iskut River.

See also
 List of British Columbia rivers

References 

Cassiar Land District
Rivers of British Columbia
Stikine Country
Stikine Plateau
Tahltan
Tahltan Highland